Daniel Dubois (born 6 September 1997) is a British professional boxer who has held the WBA (Regular) heavyweight title since June 2022. He has previously held multiple regional heavyweight championships, including the British and Commonwealth titles from 2019 to 2020. As an amateur, he was a five-time national junior titlist and British champion. He is known for his punching power and currently holds a 95% knockout-to-win percentage.

Amateur career
His father took him to the boxing gym at the age of nine to stay out of trouble in South London. He trains at the Peacock Gym in Canning Town, working under Tony and Martin Bowers. Dubois had around 75 amateur bouts. He won two English schoolboy titles, two junior ABAs plus the CYPs. Won the British Seniors. He spent a year and a half as part of the GB Elite set-up in Sheffield and boxed for England around a dozen times, competing at the European Youth championships twice and winning gold medals at multi-nations in Tammer (Finland) and Brandenburg (Germany). He left the amateurs early with only a handful of senior amateur bouts. He was on the Great Britain Olympic team with the plan to compete at the 2020 Tokyo Olympics, however he opted to turn professional instead, signing with boxing promoter Frank Warren of Queensberry Promotions.

Professional career

Early career 
Dubois' first fight as a professional was a knockout win in the first 35 seconds of the first round against Marcus Kelly in April 2017. In his fourth fight, he knocked out Mauricio Barragan, a late substitute, in the second round to win the vacant WBC Youth heavyweight title. In October 2017, he knocked out AJ Carter in the first round to claim the Southern Area heavyweight title. He won the English heavyweight title in his eighth fight in June 2018, beating journeyman Tom Little by stoppage in the fifth round. He won the WBO European title in March 2019, beating former WBO heavyweight title challenger, Răzvan Cojanu, in two rounds. Dubois was taken the full distance for the first time by veteran Kevin Johnson in October 2018, winning on points after ten rounds, and beat Richard Lartey in the fourth round in April 2019.

In July 2019, he beat Nathan Gorman by knockout in the fifth round to improve his record to 12 wins, 11 by stoppage, and win the vacant British heavyweight title. Boxing journalist Steve Bunce said he “...fought like an old, seasoned bruiser, his feet flawless, his jab a stiff weapon inherited from relics of the ring". BBC boxing correspondent Mike Costello described him as "...one of the brightest prospects in the sport at the moment."

In his next fight, Dubois faced Ebenezer Tetteh. Dubois blasted Tetteh out in the first round, while dropping him twice in the process.

After that, Dubois faced Japanese heavyweight Kyotaro Fujimoto. Fujimoto was overmatched from the beginning, fighting to survive from the opening bell. In the second round, Dubois connected on a right hand that knocked out Fujimoto.

On 29 August, 2020, Dubois had another dominant win, this time against Ricardo Snijders. Dubois managed to drop his opponent three times in the first round. The first round would end up being the last that Snijders would survive, as the referee waved the fight off after Dubois dropped his opponent for the fourth time.

Rise up the ranks 
On 28 November 2020, Dubois made the first defence of his British and Commonwealth titles, alongside his WBC Silver and WBO International titles, in a highly anticipated domestic matchup against Joe Joyce at the Church House in London, with the vacant European title also on the line. In a closely contested fight that had implications for future world title hopes, Dubois was landing the harder and cleaner punches while Joyce stayed at range behind powerful jabs. The repeated accurate jabs from Joyce caused swelling to the left eye of Dubois from the second round. In the tenth, after another hard jab landed on his now-swollen-shut eye, Dubois went down on one knee, allowing the referee to count him out to suffer the first loss of his career. Following the fight it was revealed that Dubois had suffered a broken left orbital bone and nerve damage around the eye.

After a layoff of over six months, Dubois returned to the ring on 5 June 2021 to face Bogdan Dinu in Telford. Dubois won the bout by second-round knockout, winning the vacant WBA interim heavyweight title in the process. The win also made him the mandatory challenger for the WBA (Regular) title held by undefeated Trevor Bryan.

Dubois made his US debut on the undercard of Jake Paul vs. Tyron Woodley on 29 August 2021. He faced Joe Cusumano, and prevailed via first-round technical knockout victory. In his post-fight interview, he expressed interest in challenging Trevor Bryan for his WBA (Regular) title.

WBA (Regular) heavyweight champion
On 11 June 2022, Dubois defeated Trevor Bryan by knockout in the fourth round to become the WBA (Regular) heavyweight champion in front of approximately 500 spectators at Casino Miami in Florida on a card promoted by Don King.

Dubois made the first defense of his WBA (Regular) heavyweight title against Kevin Lerena on 3 December 2022, at the Tottenham Hotspur Stadium, in London, England on the undercard of Tyson Fury vs Derek Chisora III. Although he was knocked down in the first round 3 times, he prevailed and won by 3rd round technical knockout.

Personal life
Dubois' father is from Grenada. His younger sister Caroline Dubois is also a boxer. She has represented Great Britain and in 2018 became the -60 kg European Junior, World Youth and Youth Olympic champion.

Professional boxing record

References

External links 

Daniel Dubois – Profile, News Archive & Current Rankings at Box.Live

 
 
 
 

Date of birth missing (living people)
Living people
People from Greenwich
English male boxers
English sportspeople of Grenadian descent
Boxers from Greater London
Heavyweight boxers
British Boxing Board of Control champions
Commonwealth Boxing Council champions
1997 births